Adlard Coles Nautical is a nautical publisher, with over 300 books in print. The company publishes books on topics of interest to sailors and motorboaters and also ‘landlubbers’ with an interest in the sea. Their list includes almanacs, cruising guides, pilot books and how-to instruction books, as well as large format photographic books, sailing narratives and sea-related reference, maritime history, humour and trivia books.

Adlard Coles Nautical has been part of Bloomsbury Publishing since 2003.

History
The company was founded by yachtsman Kaines Adlard Coles in 1947. He wrote many of the books, including pilots, sailing narratives and Heavy Weather Sailing, which continues to be published by the company (in an updated form).

A & C Black Publishers, which had bought Nautical Books in 1987, acquired the Adlard Coles company in 1990 and merged the two companies into the Adlard Coles Nautical imprint.

In 2000, A & C Black was bought by Bloomsbury Publishing Plc and in 2003 the company acquired the Reeds Nautical Almanac. In September 2014, Bloomsbury bought Conway Publishing and the maritime history list now complements the Adlard Coles Nautical imprint.

Notable authors in the Adlard Coles Nautical fold
 Maurice and Maralyn Bailey
 Frank Bethwaite
 Dee Caffari
 Erskine Childers
 Bill Cooper
 Laurel Cooper
 Jimmy Cornell
 Tom Cunliffe
 Frank Dye
 David Ellery
 Paul Elvstrøm
 Maurice Griffiths
 Paul Heiney
 Halsey Herreshoff
 Sir Robin Knox-Johnston
 Tristan Jones
 Sam Llewellyn
 Czesław Marchaj
 Bernard Moitessier
 Crispin Money-Coutts, 9th Baron Latymer
 Mike Peyton
 Libby Purves
 Joshua Slocum
 Richard Woodman

References

External links
 
 Reeds Nautical Almanac official website

Book publishing companies of the United Kingdom
Publishing companies established in 1947
1947 establishments in the United Kingdom